Aurelio "Al" Tomaini (February 25, 1912 – August 30, 1962), was once the world's tallest person. Tomaini claimed a height of 8 feet, 5½ inches. Tomaini was the son of Santo Tomaini and Maria Bossone. At the age of 12, he was taller than his father, who stood 6 feet, 3 inches tall. He had a great-grandfather in Italy who was also of abnormal height. His parents consulted a physician who, through the use of X-rays, discovered the cause of his giantism to be an over-active pituitary gland.

Tomaini was a sideshow performer. He was working in a circus at the Great Lakes Exposition in Cleveland in 1943, when he met his future wife, Jeanie Smith. After eloping from the circus, the couple settled in the circus community of Gibsonton, Florida. There he became active in community affairs. He was owner and operator of Giants Camp lodge and Fish Camp, a television repair shop, and a tourist trailer court. He weighed 357 pounds and wore size 26 shoes. He died in 1962.

References

External links
 
 
 tomaini.com

People with gigantism
1912 births
1962 deaths
Sideshow performers
American circus performers
People from Long Branch, New Jersey
People from Gibsonton, Florida